David Juskow (sometimes credited as Dave Juskow) is an American comedian, writer and actor. Juskow is perhaps best known for such televisions shows and films as Men of a Certain Age, Dr. Katz, Professional Therapist, TV Funhouse, The Sarah Silverman Program , The Wrestler and HBO's Crashing (American TV series).

Juskow is also a commentator for The Huffington Post. and host of the Podcast, The Nightfly

References

External links

Living people
American male comedians
American comedy writers
American male voice actors
American male television actors
American male film actors
People from Brunswick, New York
Year of birth missing (living people)
21st-century American comedians